Sankashti Chaturthi, also known as Sankatahara Chaturthi, is a day in every lunar month of the Hindu calendar dedicated to Hindu God Ganesha. This day falls on the fourth day of the Krishna Paksha (the dark lunar phase or the waning fortnight of the moon). If this Chaturthi falls on a Tuesday, it is called Angaraki Sankashti Chaturthi. Angaraki Sankashti Chaturthi is considered highly important among all Sankashti Chaturthi days. This is said to have started around 700 BC as an obstacle removal ritual regarding conflicting views of confidence as stated by Abhisheka Maharishi in tutoring his pupil Aishwarya while deriving due reason from the scriptures.

Details
On this day, devotees observe a strict fast. They break the fast at night after having darshan/auspicious sight of the moon preceded by prayers to Ganesha. The Angaraki Chaturthi (angarak in Sanskrit means red like burning coal embers and refers to the planet Mars (which Tuesday (मंगलवार) is named after). Devotees believe their wishes will be fulfilled if they pray on this day. Observing this fast is believed to reduce problems, as Ganesha is the remover of all obstacles and the supreme lord of intelligence. Before moonlight, the Ganapati Atharvasheersha is recited to invoke the blessings of Lord Ganesha. Ganesha is the god of gods. The Krishna Paksha Chaturthi in the month of Magha is also observed as Sakat Chauth.

During each month, Ganesha is worshiped with a different name and peeta (seat). On the Sakashta Chaturthi day of each month, the 'Sankashta Ganapathi Pooja' prayer is performed. Each Vratha (strict fast) has a purpose and is explained to us by a story known as the Vratha Katha. This prayer offering has 13 Vratha Kathas, one for each month and the 13th story is for adhika (The Hindu calendar has one extra month approximately every 3 years). The uniqueness of this Vratha is that the story pertaining to that month alone has to be recited.

The Sankasta Ganapathi Pooja - 13 Names and Peetas

It is believed that Ganesha bestows his presence on earth for all his devotees during this day. It is the day that Shiva declared his son Ganesha to be superior to all the other gods, except Vishnu, Lakshmi, Shiva and Parvati. Ganesha is widely worshipped as the god of wisdom, prosperity and good fortune and traditionally invoked by Hindus at the beginning of any new venture or at the start of a trip.

Legend

Traditional stories tell that Ganesha was created by the Goddess Parvati, the wife of Lord Shiva. Parvati created Ganesha out of the turmeric paste that she used for her bath and breathed life into the figure. She then set him to stand guard at her door while she bathed. Shiva returned, and as Ganesha who didn't know him, hindered Shiva's path. Shiva got enraged and severed the head killing the boy. Parvati was upset seeing her son dead. Shiva understanding his mistake promised that her son would live. Brahma the creator of life asked Shiva to use the head of the first animal he see in the forest. An elephant calf ended up as the first animal and its head was used to bring Ganesha back to life.Shiva.declared the boy be called "Ganesha" (Gana-isha: lord of Ganas) Hence, Ganesha came to be depicted as the elephant-headed god.

Date
Sankashti Chaturthi comes on every 4th day after Pournami full moon (Krishna Paksha) of Hindu lunar calendar month.

Regional Variations
In Jammu, this fast is observed on fourth day of Krishna Paksha of Magha month of Hindu Calendar. It is celebrated in reverence to Hindu God Ganesha. Dogra women perform Arghya to Chandrama at night. Bhugga (Til Jaggery mixture) and Radish are donated and eaten to complete the fast.

References

Festivals in India
Ganesha
Hindu holy days

Hindu festivals